Yani is a given name and a surname. Notable people with the name include:

Given name
 Yan' Dargent (1824–1899), French painter
 Yani Gellman (born 1985), Canadian actor
 Yani Ignatov (born 1959), Bulgarian rower
 Yani Marchokov (born 1975), Qatari weightlifter
 Yani Pehlivanov (born 1988), Bulgarian footballer
 Yani Rosenthal (born 1965), Honduran businessman and politician
 Yani Tseng (born 1989), Taiwanese golfer
 Yani Urdinov (born 1991), Macedonian footballer
 Yani Xander (born 1997), Bulgarian Actor

Surname
 Ahmad Yani (1922–1965), Indonesian general
 Michael Yani (born 1980), American tennis player
 Wang Yani (born 1975), Chinese artist

See also
 Yanni (disambiguation)